Paul Soskin (23 February 190515 July 1975) was a Russian Empire-born British screenwriter and film producer. Soskin was born in Crimea. His first few films in Britain were low-budget quota quickies, but his breakthrough came with the 1941 comedy Quiet Wedding starring Margaret Lockwood. In 1948 he produced director Roy Ward Baker's drama The Weaker Sex for Two Cities Films.

His daughter Tatiana married Roddy Llewellyn.

Filmography
 Ten Minute Alibi (1935)
 While Parents Sleep (1935)
 Two's Company (1936)
 Quiet Wedding (1941)
 The Day Will Dawn (1942)
 The Weaker Sex (1948)
 Waterfront (1950)
 High Treason (1951)
 Top of the Form (1953)
 All for Mary (1955)
 Happy Is the Bride (1958)
 Law and Disorder (1958)

References

Bibliography
 Mayer, Geoff. Roy Ward Baker''. Manchester University Press, 2004.

External links

1905 births
1975 deaths
People from Kerch
Soviet emigrants to the United States
British film producers
British male screenwriters
20th-century British screenwriters